The 2012 Green National Convention took place on July 12–15, 2012 in Baltimore, Maryland. The Annual National Meeting of the Green Party of the United States occurred at the University of Baltimore (William H. Thumel Sr. Business Center), with the National Convention on July 14 being held at the Holiday Inn Inner Harbor (Chesapeake Room).

The convention was preceded by the 2012 Green Party presidential primaries.

Nomination
Jill Stein of Massachusetts won the presidential nomination with 193.5 out of 294 delegates' votes. Television personality Roseanne Barr received 72 votes and 17 votes were cast for activist Kent Mesplay.

Candidates

Results

Cheri Honkala, an anti-poverty activist from Pennsylvania, won the vice-presidential nomination.

See also
Other Green National Convention
2000
2004
2008
Other parties' presidential nominating convention of 2012:
Democratic
Libertarian
Republican

References

Green National Convention
2010s in Baltimore
Green Party of the United States National Conventions
Political conventions in Baltimore
Green National Convention
Green National Convention
Green National Convention